Judgment Night may refer to:

 "Judgment Night" (The Twilight Zone), an episode of the U.S. television series The Twilight Zone
 Judgment Night (film), a 1993 action thriller film 
 Judgment Night (soundtrack), the soundtrack album for the aforementioned film
 Judgment Night (collection), a 1952 book collecting science fiction short stories by American author C.L. Moore